Reynold Karl Axel Furustrand (born 8 April 1942) is a Swedish politician and former member of the Riksdag, the national legislature. A member of the Social Democratic Party, he represented Södermanland County between October 1986 and October 2006. He was a member of the European Parliament between January 1995 and October 1995. He was a member of the municipal council in Eskilstuna Municipality from 1976 to 1979.

References

1942 births
Living people
Members of the Riksdag 1985–1988
Members of the Riksdag 1988–1991
Members of the Riksdag 1991–1994
Members of the Riksdag 1994–1998
Members of the Riksdag 1998–2002
Members of the Riksdag 2002–2006
Members of the Riksdag from the Social Democrats
MEPs for Sweden 1995–1999
Swedish Social Democratic Party MEPs